Aurotalis is a genus of moths of the family Crambidae.

Species
Aurotalis delicatalis (Hampson, 1919)
Aurotalis dionisa Bleszynski, 1970
Aurotalis hermione Bassi, 1999
Aurotalis nigrisquamalis (Hampson, 1919)
Aurotalis similis Bassi, 1999

References

Crambinae
Crambidae genera
Taxa named by Stanisław Błeszyński